Zamenabad may refer to:
 Zamenabad, Isfahan
 Zamenabad, Kurdistan